Jen Da Silva–Geisler (born December 4, 1989) is model, dancer as part of the 26K girls of Kapamilya, Deal or No Deal and former housemate of Pinoy Big Brother: Celebrity Edition 2.

Personal life
She married taekwondo master and fellow housemate Donald Geisler in a simple ceremony in Las Piñas in December 2008. She is a half sister of a former actor Dennis Da Silva. The couple had a daughter.

She went to St. Therese School from 2004 to 2005 and from 2006 to 2007.

Filmography

Television

References

1989 births
Living people
Pinoy Big Brother contestants
Star Magic
Place of birth missing (living people)
Filipino female models